Straight Shooting is a 1917 American silent Western film directed by John Ford and featuring Harry Carey. Prints of this film survive in the International Museum of Photography and Film at George Eastman House. Like many American films of the time, Straight Shooting was subject to cuts by city and state film censorship boards. The Chicago Board of Censors refused to issue a permit for this film as submitted as it consists of detailed portrayal of murder and outlawry.

Plot
At the end of the 19th century in the Far West, a farmer is fighting for his right to plough the plains. In order to expel the farmers, the ranchers try to control access to water.

Cast
 Harry Carey as Cheyenne Harry
 Duke R. Lee as Thunder Flint (credited as Duke Lee)
 George Berrell as Sweet Water Sims
 Molly Malone as Joan Sims
 Ted Brooks as Ted Sims
 Hoot Gibson as Danny Morgan (credits) / Sam Turner (titles)
 Milton Brown as Black-Eye Pete (credited as Milt Brown)
 Vester Pegg as Placer Fremont

Production
John Ford's older brother Francis proposed John to direct the film after the first director left. Harry Carey and John Ford hit it off immediately and continued to work together after the success of the film. Carey mentored Ford "he tutored me in the early years sort of brought me along".

Most of the exterior sets were built and the film was shot on the Universal backlot. Ford concocted a scheme to make a feature length film out of what was budgeted to be a two reel film by telling Universal some of the exposed film had fallen in a river. When Universal realized that they had a full length film on their hands, the studio was upset. Studio executive Carl Laemmle pointed out that, if he paid for a suit and got an extra pair of pants, he wouldn’t just throw them away.

See also
 Harry Carey filmography
 Hoot Gibson filmography

References

External links

 

1917 films
1917 Western (genre) films
American black-and-white films
Films directed by John Ford
Silent American Western (genre) films
Universal Pictures films
1910s English-language films
1910s American films